Mehnatobod is a former district of Sirdaryo Region in Uzbekistan. In 2004 it was abolished and its territory was divided between the Mirzaobod District and the Xovos District. The capital was the village Qahramon, and its population was 23,100 in 2000.

References

Districts of Uzbekistan
Sirdaryo Region